
Gmina Szadek is an urban-rural gmina (administrative district) in Zduńska Wola County, Łódź Voivodeship, in central Poland.

Villages
Apart from the town of Szadek, Gmina Szadek contains the villages and settlements of Antonin, Boczki, Borki Prusinowskie, Brondy, Choszczewo, Czarny Las, Dziadkowice, Górna Wola, Góry Prusinowskie, Grzybów, Jamno, Karczówek, Kobyla Miejska, Kotlinki, Kotliny, Krokocice, Lichawa, Łobudzice, Nowy Kromolin, Ogrodzim, Piaski, Prusinowice, Przatów Dolny, Przatów Górny, Reduchów, Rzepiszew, Sikucin, Stary Kromolin, Szadkowice, Tarnówka, Wielka Wieś, Wilamów, Wola Krokocka, Wola Łobudzka and Wola Przatowska.

Neighbouring gminas
Gmina Szadek is bordered by the gminas of Łask, Warta, Wodzierady, Zadzim and Zduńska Wola.

References
Polish official population figures 2006

Szadek
Zduńska Wola County